Christian Wolfgang Herdtrich (25 June 1625– 18 July 1684) was an Austrian Jesuit missionary to the Qing Empire. As he wrote his works in Latin, he is also known as

Life

Christian Wolfgang Herdtrich was born at Graz, Styria, in the Austrian Empire on 25 June 1625.

Herdtrich entered the Austrian province of the Society of Jesus on 27 October 1641, and in 1656 was chosen for the Chinese mission. For two years he laboured on the island of Sulawesi ("Celebes"). After 1660, he moved to the Chinese provinces of Shanxi and Henan. In 1671, he was called to the imperial court in Beijing as a mathematician; there, he joined a group of scholarly Jesuits with whom the Kangxi Emperor surrounded himself. The last nine years of his life were spent as superior of the mission of "Kiang-tcheon" in Shanxi.

He died on 18 July 1684. The Kangxi Emperor himself wrote on Herdtrich's epitaph.

Works
Herdtrich professed a profound knowledge of the Chinese language and literature. He collaborated with Philippe Couplet, Prospero Intorcetta, and François de Rougemont in compiling Confucius, the Philosopher of the Chinese, a major introduction to Chinese history and thought that was published in Paris in 1687. Herdtrich was also the author of a large Chinese-Latin dictionary (Wentse-Ko), probably one of the first of its kind.

Notes

References

Citations

Bibliography
 Huonder, Deutsche Jesuitenmissionäire (Freiburg im Br., 1899), 188;
 Dahlmann, Die Sprachenkunde und de Missionen (Freiburg im Br., 1891), 32-37;
 Hazart-Sontermann, Kirchengesch., I (Vienna and Munich, 1707), 706 sqq.
 . 

Letters of Herdritch may be found in:
 Intorcetta, Compendiosa Narratione della Missione Cinense (Rome, 1672), 115-128;
 Adrien Greslon, Histoire de la Chine sous la domination des Tartares (Partis, 1670), 56;
 Kathol. Missionen (Freiburg im Br.) for 1901-02, pp. 25 sqq.; 1905-05, pp. 4 sqq.

External links 

 Catholic Encyclopedia article
 

1625 births
1684 deaths
17th-century Austrian Jesuits
Roman Catholic missionaries in China
Austrian Roman Catholic missionaries
Austrian expatriates in China
Writers from Graz
Clergy from Graz